Kurru may refer to:

In Australian Aboriginal languages:
 -kurru, an allative suffix in the Wanyi language

In Ancient Nubia:
 El-Kurru, a cemetery used by the Nubian royal family.

In South India:
 Kurru or Kurru basha an alternate name for the Yerukala language
 Kurrus, an alternate name for the Yerukala people

In Thailand:
 the old form of Kru, a Thai language honorific for:
 an instructor or master teacher of Muay Thai
 teachers at primary/elementary and kindergarten/preschool level

See also
Kuru (disambiguation)
Kru (disambiguation)